Wharton Elementary School may refer to:
 Wharton Dual Language Academy, formerly known as William Wharton Elementary School, in the Houston Independent School District - Houston
 Thomas Wharton Elementary School - School District of Lancaster - Lancaster, Pennsylvania
 Wharton Elementary School - Wharton Independent School District - Wharton, Texas